Nkosiyabo Xakane is a football defender. He plays for FC Cape Town in the South African National First Division.

References

Living people
1985 births
Association football defenders
AmaZulu F.C. players
South African soccer players